Balaenifrons homopteridia is a moth in the family Crambidae. It was described by George Hampson in 1896. It is found in Myanmar, Bengal (in what was British India) and northern Borneo.

The wingspan is about 20 mm. The forewings are purplish red, irrorated (sprinkled) with ochreous. The hindwings are yellowish brown.

References

Moths described in 1896
Odontiinae
Moths of Asia